Kočín-Lančár ( or ) is a village and municipality in Piešťany District in the Trnava Region of western Slovakia.

History
In historical records the village was first mentioned in 1262.

Geography
The municipality lies at an altitude of 227 metres and covers an area of 13.119 km². It has a population of about 521 people.

Genealogical resources

The records for genealogical research are available at the state archive "Statny Archiv in Bratislava, Slovakia"

 Roman Catholic church records (births/marriages/deaths): 1703-1928 (parish B)

See also
 List of municipalities and towns in Slovakia

References

External links

 Official page
Surnames of living people in Kocin

Villages and municipalities in Piešťany District